Provincial Road 500 (PR 500) is a provincial secondary highway located in the Canadian province of Manitoba.  It runs from PTH 12, southeast of Grand Beach, to PTH 12/PTH 59 near Beaconia.

Route description

Communities along the route 
Beaconia

Notable places along the route 
Lake Winnipeg's east coast.
Patricia and Grand beaches, clothing-optional.

Junction list 
In addition to the intersections mentioned below, there many unnamed roads off of PR 500.

References

External links 
Official Name and Location - Declaration of Provincial Roads Regulation - The Highways and Transportation Act - Provincial Government of Manitoba
Official Highway Map - Published and maintained by the Department of Infrastructure - Provincial Government of Manitoba (see Legend and Map#3)
Google Maps Search - Provincial Road 500

500